The province of Fermo is a province in the Marche region of central Italy. It was established in 2004 and became operational in 2009. Its administrative centre and provincial capital is the city of Fermo (population of 37,995 inhabitants). Other major cities include Porto Sant'Elpidio (25,118 inhabitants), Porto San Giorgio (16,201 inhabitants), Sant'Elpidio a Mare (16,838 inhabitants), and Montegranaro (13,358 inhabitants). It contains 40 comuni.

History
An 1861 report by Minister Minghetti to Prince Eugene of Savoy, Lieutenant of the King, justified merging the small and fragmented provinces of southern Marche into a single large province, a move to overcome the historical border between the Kingdom of the Two Sicilies and the Papal States. The residents of Abruzzo and Cardinal Filippo de Angelis were opposed to this. Despite this, 58% of the population of Fermo voted in favour of merging some smaller provinces, and the province of Ascoli-Fermo was created and became known as Ascoli Piceno.

In 2000, supporters of forming a new province of Fermo exploited a pact between the Lega Nord and Forza Italia who had formed a number of proposals regarding establishing provincial bodies, including one that later led to the foundation of the province of Monza and Brianza. Fabrizio Cesetti was the only signatory of the act forming the province, which was delayed due to the conclusion of the Legislature XIII of Italy. Following this, Law 147/2004 was passed, and the province of Fermo was established in 2004.

Geography
The Province of Fermo is in the Marche region of central Italy, and stretches from the Sibillini Mountains to the Adriatic Sea. Its main geographic feature is the valley of the River Tenna. This river rises in the mountains, enters the province near Servigliano, passes through Grottazzolina and Montegiorgio, and reaches the sea near Sant'Elpidio a Mare and Porto Sant'Elpidio. The River Aso forms the southern border of the province, separating it from the Province of Ascoli Piceno. It rises in the mountains and flows into the Adriatic Sea at Pedaso. To the north of the province lies the Province of Macerata. Footwear and leather goods are produced in the area, and the main agricultural products are cereals, vegetables, grapes, olives and livestock.

The town of Fermo, the capital of the province, is an old town perched on a hill. It has a historic centre, a large piazza and a cathedral dating from 1227 with a Gothic facade. There are also traces of a Roman amphitheatre nearby. The neighbouring municipality of Porto San Giorgio has a castle dating from 1269, which protected the valley that leads to Fermo.

Government

References

External links

 

 

 
Fermo
2004 establishments in Italy